Ione Belarra Urteaga (born 25 September 1987) is a Spanish politician and psychologist from Podemos who currently serves as Minister of Social Rights and 2030 Agenda. She has been her party's leader since June 2021.

Early life and education 
Born in Pamplona, Navarre, Belarra graduated in Psychology in 2012 from the Autonomous University of Madrid, where she was a classmate of Irene Montero. She earned a master's degree in Education, and both she and Montero left their doctoral programmes because of their political careers. 

One of Belarra's earliest activist campaigns was against immigrant detention centres.

Political career 
Belarra joined Podemos in its founding year, 2014. The following year, she entered its national executive, the Citizens' Council, where she was put in charge of the area of Human Rights, Citizenship and Diversity. She led Podemos's list in the Navarre constituency in the 2015 Spanish general election, being one of two Podemos members elected by the region. From July 2018, she and Pablo Echenique filled in as parliamentary and general spokespeople of Podemos respectively, during Montero and Pablo Iglesias's joint maternity/paternity leave.

After the November 2019 Spanish general election, Podemos entered government with the Spanish Socialist Workers' Party (PSOE), and Belarra became Secretary of State for the 2030 Agenda from January 2020 to March 2021. She then became Minister of Social Rights and 2030 Agenda.

After Iglesias's retirement, Belarra was voted secretary general of Podemos with 88.69% of the members' votes in June 2021, while Yolanda Díaz succeeded Iglesias as leader of Unidas Podemos.

Animal Welfare Law 
In 2022, Belarra introduced legislation to ban the sale of pets in shops, convert zoos into wildlife recovery centres and impose prison sentences for abusers as part of Spain's first animal-rights bill, which notably did not target bullfighting. A month later, the PSOE group in the Congress of Deputies tabled an amendment to restrict the scope of the text, excluding animals related to hunting, a decision which was strongly criticised by Unidas Podemos.

Despite this disagreement, the two parties voted together in Congress on 6 October to reject the motions to reject the bill tabled by the People's Party (PP), Vox and the Basque Nationalist Party (PNV).

The bill remains highly controversial. In March 2022, tens of thousands of hunters demonstrated in "defence of the rural world", against "animalist dictatorship" and in favour of "freedom". The far-right party Vox, which is very committed to this issue, denounced a law that "gives rights to those who have no responsibilities".

References

1987 births
Living people
Autonomous University of Madrid alumni
Members of the 11th Congress of Deputies (Spain)
Members of the 12th Congress of Deputies (Spain)
Members of the 13th Congress of Deputies (Spain)
Members of the 14th Congress of Deputies (Spain)
People from Pamplona
Politicians from Navarre
Podemos (Spanish political party) politicians
Spanish women psychologists
Leaders of political parties in Spain